Dysprosium(II) chloride (DyCl2), also known as dysprosium dichloride, is an ionic chemical compound of dysprosium and chlorine. This salt is a reduced compound, as the normal oxidation state of dysprosium in dysprosium compounds is +3.

Dysprosium dichloride is glossy black in appearance. The salt is damaged by oxidation on exposure to air. It is an electrical insulator.

The structure is the same as for strontium bromide, ytterbium dichloride, and terbium dichloride. There are two forms. The low temperature form is below 652 °C. It is orthorhombic with unit cell dimensions a=6.69, b=6.76, and c=7.06 Å.

Preparation
Dysprosium dichloride can be prepared by heating molten dysprosium trichloride with dysprosium metal, and rapidly quenching. Molybdenum, niobium or tantalum crucibles are required to avoid alloy formation with the dysprosium.

Reactions
Dysprosium dichloride is capable of reducing titanium dichloride to titanium metal in a potassium chloride, sodium chloride flux.

 Ti2+ + 2Dy2+ → Ti (solid) + 2Dy3+

Related
A ternary dysprosium(II) chloride compound is known with lithium: LiDy2Cl5. This is produced by heating lithium metal and dysprosium trichloride together at 700 °C. This compound is also black. The crystal system of LiDy2Cl5 is monoclinic  with space group C2/c 4 formulae per unit cell which has dimensions ; a = 16.45.6(b = 6.692; and c = 7.267; with β = 95.79°.

References

Dysprosium compounds
Chlorides
Lanthanide halides